Pyspread is a non-traditional spreadsheet. Cells in pyspread's grid accept expressions in the Python programming language.
A cell can return any Python object, which allows calculations with vectors, matrices, fractions, arbitrary precision numbers and symbols.
Therefore, pyspread follows an approach that is similar to the spreadsheet SIAG from Siag Office.

Besides text, pyspread can display bitmap and vector images in its cells.
It provides a graphical front-end for creating matplotlib charts.
Pyspread can import and export data from and to CSV files and Microsoft Excel xls files.
Spreadsheets can be exported to files in Portable Document Format and Scalable Vector Graphics format.

Pyspread has been mentioned for its GNU Privacy Guard based security approach
and its capability to access local files and the Web from cell code.

Pyspread runs on Linux and Microsoft Windows. 
It has been packaged for the Linux distributions Arch, Debian, Mageia, Slackware
and Ubuntu.
Pyspread is developed and maintained by Martin Manns.
It is licensed under the GPL-3.0-or-later license and therefore is free software.

References

External links 

 
 https://gitlab.com/pyspread/pyspread

Spreadsheet software
Python (programming language) software
Software that uses wxWidgets
Free software
Free spreadsheet software
Cross-platform software